Sailing/Yachting is an Olympic sport starting from the Games of the 1st Olympiad (1896 Olympics in Athens, Greece). With the exception of the 1904 and the canceled 1916 Summer Olympics, sailing has always been included on the Olympic schedule.
The Sailing program of 1908 was open for a total of five sailing classes (disciplines), but actually only four Sailing events were contested. The planned venue of all races, named matches, was Ryde, Isle of Wight.

Venue 

At the 1907 The Hague Conference of the IOC Ryde at the Isle of Wight was appointed to host the sailing regattas, for all classes, of the games of the IVth Olympiad. However, when there were only two British entries for the 12 Metre matches, and both yacht were located at the Firth of Clyde, the decision was made to use Hunters Quay as a second venue.

Royal Victoria Yacht Club, Ryde 
The RVYC was founded on 24 May 1845 by Prince Albert to give Queen Victoria a Yacht Club which she was entitled to enter as a mere female!

For the Olympic matches the race committee used the available shipping buoys as marks for the courses. for the classes the following course lengths were used:
 6 Metre: 
 7 Metre: 
 8 Metre:

Clyde Corinthian Yacht Club, Hunters Quay 
 12 Metre:

Course areas 
The following course areas were used during the 1908 Olympic sailing regattas:

Competition

Overview 

A maximum of 2 boats per country per class was allowed.

Continents

Countries 
Source:

Classes (equipment) 
Source:
Although one of the oldest organized sporting activities, sailing in the early first part of the 20th century was not uniformly organized. This had a lot to do with national traditions as well as with the fact that there were no standardized boat types with uniform building instructions and measurements. Also a lot of development was done in the area of boat design and boat building. The shape of a boat, specifically its length, its weight and its sail area, are major parameters that determine the boat's speed. Several initiatives were started to create a formula that made it possible to have boats race each other without having to calculate the final result. But the different countries initially could not agree on an international system. At the Olympics of 1900 it was clear that sailing was not ready for international competition, and something had to be done.

In 1906 international meetings were organize to solve the problem.  Finally in Paris, October 1907 the first International Rule was ratified. Delegates from this meeting went on to form the International Yacht Racing Union (IYRU), the precursor to the present International Sailing Federation (ISAF).

The agreed formula gives a result in meters (Metre). During the meeting in 1907 the IOC made the decision to open the 1908 Summer Olympics for the following Metre classes:
{|class="wikitable" style="text-align:center"
  |-
  |colspan="7"|
    
  |-
  ! Class !! Type !! Venue !! Event !! Sailors !! First OG !! Olympics so far
  |-
  |style="text-align:left"| 6 Metre || Keelboat || Ryde         ||  ||  3 || 1908 || 1 
  |-
  |style="text-align:left"| 7 Metre || Keelboat     || Ryde         ||  ||  4 || 1908 || 1
  |-
  |style="text-align:left"| 8 Metre || Keelboat     || Ryde         ||  ||  5 || 1908 || 1
  |-
  |style="text-align:left"| 12 Metre || Keelboat        || Hunters Quay ||  || 10 || 1908 || 1
  |-
  |style="text-align:left"| 15 Metre || Keelboat        || No show      ||  || Unknown || 1908 || 0
  |-
  |colspan="7"|'Legend:  = Mixed gender event
  |-
  |colspan="7"|
    
|}

 Race schedule 
Source:

 Medal summary 

 Medal table 

 Notes 
 This Olympic sailing event was gender independent, however only two women, Frances Rivett-Carnac in the 7 Metre, and the Duchess of Westminster as extra on her 8 Metre, participated. The duchess of Westminster also distributed the diplomas of special merit to the competitors of the other Olympic sports on 25 July 1908. Gender specific events however had to wait until 1988.
 The matches at Ryde were held in light air conditions.
 All members of a team had to be a citizen of the country they represent. However the boats used did not have to be built in the same country that the team was representing since the Olympic games are considered a test of skills and handling for the team and not a test of the yacht. This in contrast with the matches for the America's cup of that time.
 A second 7 Metre yacht Mignonette was entered under command of Capt. R. Sloane-Stanley but failed to make it to the starting line.
 At the end of the official report the following suggestion was made: It has been suggested that in the yacht racing of future Olympic Games it might be better to select a fleet of "one-design" boats in the waters where the Games are held, and let all the crews entered draw lots for them every day, with the proviso that no crew should have the same boat twice. Sailing had to wait until 1920 before the first "one-design" class was selected for the Games.

 Other information 
During the Sailing regattas at the 1908 Summer Olympics among others the following persons were competing in the various classes:
 , Johan Anker, Multiple Olympic competitor and designer of many Metre yachts as well as the 1948 Olympic Dragon, in the 8 Metre Fram , Duchess of Westminster as owner and extra crewmember of the 8 Metre Sorais , William Dudley Ward in the 8 Metre Sorais , Harald Wallin in Vinga''

Further reading

References 

 
1908 Summer Olympics events
1908
1908 in sailing
Sport on the Isle of Wight
Sailing in Scotland
Sailing competitions in the United Kingdom
Sport in Argyll and Bute